In molecular biology, small nucleolar RNA SNORA10 and small nuclear RNA SNORA64 are homologous members of the H/ACA class of small nucleolar RNA (snoRNA). This family of ncRNAs involved in the maturation of ribosomal RNA.
snoRNA in this family act as guides in the modification of uridines to pseudouridines. This family includes the human snoRNAs U64 and ACA10 and mouse MBI-29.

References

External links
 
 Link to the snoRNAbase entry for SNORA10
 Link to the snoRNAbase entry for SNORA64

Small nuclear RNA